Blyford (formerly known as Blythford) is a village and civil parish in the East Suffolk district of Suffolk, England, about  east of Halesworth and separated from Wenhaston by the River Blyth, Suffolk to the south. It is in the civil parish of Sotherton.

Population in 1801 was 163 and by 1840 had risen to 223. In 1861 the population was 193.

In 1870–72, John Marius Wilson's Imperial Gazetteer of England and Wales described Blyford like this:

On 9 August 2010, BBC Radio Suffolk reported at the 14th/15th century thatched Queen's Head Inn. The inn sign features St Etheldreda as the Queen. Chickens are located at the inn. The thatched roof was replaced in 1988 after a fire.

The church is just across the road from the inn with rumours of a smugglers' passage being located there.
The church was built in 1088, with a 13th-century font added.

References

External links 

Blyford All Saints church website

Villages in Suffolk
Civil parishes in Suffolk